CS Meaux Academy Football is a French football club, based in the town of Meaux. Former players include Marc Lévy, Philippe Anziani, Francis Llacer, Frédéric Déhu, Franck Leboeuf Andrzej Zgutczyński, Joël Cantona, and the goalkeeper Yohann Pelé, Geoffrey Jourdren.

Players

Current squad

External links
Official site

References

Meaux
Meaux
Meaux
Association football clubs established in 1909
1909 establishments in France